Monselice is a town and municipality (comune) located in northeastern Italy, in the Veneto region, in the province of Padua about  southwest of the city of Padua, at the southern edge of the Euganean Hills (Colli Euganei).

Monselice is the most picturesque town I have seen in Italy. It has an old ruin of a castle upon the hill and thence commands a beautiful and extraordinary view. It lies in the wide plain – a dead level – whereon Ferrara, Bologna, Rovigo, Este, Padua stand and even Venice we could dimly see in the horizon rising with her tiara of proud towers. What a walk and what a wide delightful picture. To Venice 38 miles. 

Ralph Waldo Emerson Journals (31 May 1833)

History
The town's mythological foundation is attributed to the Trojan hero Opsicella. The area shows evidence of human settlement since the Bronze Age.

In Roman times it was known as Mons Silicis, meaning "mountain of flintstone", possibly due to the local quarries of trachyte.

The earliest known documents about Monselice date back to 568 AD and are related to the conquest of the town by the Lombards. The town was under Byzantine rule for a brief period until its conquest by king Agilulf around 602.

During the Comuni period (12th century) the town had its own local self-government. The town was aligned with the Ghibellines against the Guelphs in the political and military fights of the 13th century.

The Ghibelline leader Ezzelino III da Romano improved the town's fortifications and made it one of the main strongholds of the area.

The town was then under the Carraresi (the lords of Padua) rule and in the 15th century it became part of the Republic of Venice.

After a short period of French domination, it was part of the Austrian Empire and, later, of its client Kingdom of Lombardy–Venetia.

In 1866 it became part of the Kingdom of Italy.

Main sights

The modern town lies in a wide valley between the Montericco, elevation , and the Rocca, elevation , hills (part of the Euganean Hills).

The oldest part of the town lies around the Rocca hill.

In medieval times the Rocca was heavily fortified with five girdle walls that are partially still visible today.

This building hosts the local touristic promotion board, that provides information for visits to the town's historical attractions.

Piazza Mazzini square is also the starting point for the promenade walk along , leading to the most interesting sites of the town, which include:

The Castle of Monselice (or ), which houses one of the most important collections of European medieval weapons and armors.

In 1606, Pope Paul V issued a papal bull that granted to pilgrims visiting the Sanctuary the same Catholic indulgencies granted to pilgrims visiting the seven main churches of Rome, hence the  inscription on the portal of the sanctuary.
The Keep ( or ), still standing on the Rocca hilltop. It is a tower built with regular trachyte blocks from local quarries.

Culture
A lively market is held every Monday in the town's main streets.

An important fair is traditionally held every year around November 1 (All Saints Day - saint patron day for the town). Attractions include a food and general market, local food stands, fun park, exhibits.

Started in recent years, the "Palio di Monselice" tournament has become a primary attraction. The Palio is held every year in September. It is modeled after medieval horse tournaments and it includes several other competitions: archery, chess tournament (also in the form of human chess), musicians tournament (with tambourines and "chiarine"), flag-flyers, millstone challenge and the parade of nine "contrade" in period costume.

Transportation

Monselice is well connected to the major towns of Padua, Venice and Bologna.

Monselice railway station is on the Venice-Padua-Bologna-Florence line, between Padua (North) and Bologna (South). A secondary railway line connects Monselice to the town of Mantua in Lombardy.

Twin towns
Monselice is twinned with:

  Città della Speranza, Italy, since 2006
  Poreč, Croatia, since 2010
  Niepołomice, Poland, since 2011
  Parkano, Finland, since 2015

References

External links

Town map
Monselice Turismo (Monselice touristic portal)
The Castle of Monselice (Ca' Marcello)
Touristic Promotion Board (Pro Loco, in Italian)
A selection of Monselice postcards
Ralph Waldo Emerson's impressions of Monselice

Hilltowns in Veneto
Castles in Italy